Pine Log may refer to:

 Rydal, Georgia, once called Pine Log, Georgia
 Pine Log State Forest in Florida